Lemann is a surname. Notable people with the surname include:

 Jorge Paulo Lemann (born 1939), Swiss-Brazilian businessman
 Nicholas Berthelot Lemann, American journalism professor and dean

See also 
 Lemann's Banksia
 Lehmann
 Lehman
 Leman

German-language surnames
Germanic-language surnames
Levite surnames
Jewish surnames
Yiddish-language surnames